Zarağan (also, Zaraqan and Zaragan) is a village and municipality in the Qabala Rayon of Azerbaijan.  It has a population of 2,693.

References 

Populated places in Qabala District